Alocasia hararganjensis is a pachycaul herb and flowering plant species in the Araceae family. It is closely related to Alocasia fallax but can be easily distinguished by the shape of the leaves.

Taxonomy and etymology 
Bangladeshi botanists Hosne Ara and Muhammad Abul Hasan discovered it. It is found in the Haraganj reserve forest of Lauyachhara in Moulvibazar. That is why the plant is named after that forest.

References

hararganjensis
Flora of Bangladesh